The Lent Bumps 2000 were a series of rowing races held at Cambridge University from Tuesday 29 February 2000 until Saturday 4 March 2000. The event was run as a bumps race and is one of a series of Lent Bumps which have been held annually in late-February or early March since 1887. See Lent Bumps for the format of the races. In 2000, a total of 121 crews took part (69 men's crews and 52 women's crews), with around 1000 participants in total. Several thousand spectators came to watch, particularly on the Saturday.

Head of the River crews

  women bumped  to take back the headship they lost in 1999 and collect their 9th headship since 1988.

Highest 2nd VIIIs

Links to races in other years

Bumps Charts
Below are the complete bumps charts for the races, with the men's event on the left and women's event on the right. The bumps chart represents the progress of every crew over all four days of the racing. To follow the progress of any particular crew, simply find the crew's name on the left side of the chart and follow the line to the end-of-the-week finishing position on the right of the chart.

Lent Bumps results
2000 in English sport
2000 in rowing